War is the ninth studio album from American heavy metal band Demon Hunter.  The album, together with Peace, was released by Solid State Records on March 1, 2019. The band released a string of promotional singles prior to the album's release, along with a music video for the song "On My Side".

The album earned 13,000 equivalent album units in its first week, ending March 7 to debut at No. 7 on Billboards Top Current Albums chart, according to Nielsen Music. The album was No. 55 on the Billboard 200, No. 1 on the Independent Albums chart, No. 2 Hard Music, No. 2 Christian, No. 5 Rock. Loudwire named both albums together as one of the 50 best metal albums of 2019.

 Musical style 
Vocalist Ryan Clark stated that each of the two albums (War and Peace) "could be devoted to their contrasting musical styles- heavy and melodic."

Both albums were professionally reviewed in the Jesus Freak Hideout website. In the War review, reviewer Scott Fryberger said that as much as he likes "Demon Hunter's brand of hard rock, the feature presentation is still in their metalcore", with some songs keeping its musical aspect.

 Track listing 

 Personnel Demon Hunter Ryan Clark – vocals
 Patrick Judge – lead guitar, keys
 Jeremiah Scott – rhythm guitar, production
 Jon Dunn – bass
 Timothy "Yogi" Watts – drumsAdditional Personnel'
 Zeuss - mixing and mastering

Charts

References 

Demon Hunter albums
2019 albums
Solid State Records albums